Keith Savage (born August 9, 1985 in Gulf Breeze, Florida) is a former American soccer player who is currently the head coach of the Tampa Bay Rowdies USL Academy team.

Career

College and Amateur
Savage attended Gulf Breeze High School in Gulf Breeze, Florida, played club soccer for Pensacola Revolution, and played college soccer at the University of West Florida, where he was GSC Freshman of the Year in 2003. He was named to the Division II All-South Region Team and the All-GSC First Team in 2005, earned NSCAA/adidas All-America honors in 2006, and scored 33 career goals for the Argonauts between 2003 and 2007, the fourth-highest total in school's history. 

During his college years he also played with Central Florida Kraze in the USL Premier Development League.

Professional
Savage was drafted 43rd overall of the 2008 MLS SuperDraft by Chivas USA, and made his MLS debut for Chivas against Columbus Crew on 12 April 2008. 

He was released by Chivas USA in February 2009, having played in just six league games for the team, and signed with the Portland Timbers of the USL First Division later that month.

Savage signed with FC Tampa Bay of the North American Soccer League on February 22, 2011. The contract was for one year with a club option for 2012.  Tampa Bay exercised the 2012 option on Savage on October 4, 2011.

Coaching
In June 2021 Savage was named head coach of the Tampa Bay Rowdies USL Academy side.

Personal
Savage is the son of former U.S. national team player Bruce Savage.

While playing for Chivas USA, Savage also was a trainer for the Fullerton Rangers Soccer Club in Fullerton, California. He coached the players on the U13 Fullerton Rangers in their signature league.

Savage is retired now from a torn ACL. He works as the athletic director for Skycrest Christian School in Clearwater, Florida.

Honors

Tampa Bay Rowdies
North American Soccer League:
 Champion (1) 2012

Portland Timbers
USL First Division Commissioner's Cup (1): 2009

References

External links
 Portland Timbers bio
 MLS player profile
 West Florida profile

1985 births
Living people
American soccer players
Orlando City U-23 players
Chivas USA players
Portland Timbers (2001–2010) players
Tampa Bay Rowdies players
USL League Two players
National Premier Soccer League players
Major League Soccer players
USL First Division players
USSF Division 2 Professional League players
North American Soccer League players
Chivas USA draft picks
Soccer players from Florida
People from Gulf Breeze, Florida
Tampa Bay Rowdies 2 players
Gulf Coast Premier League players
Association football wingers
University of West Florida alumni